Intercontinental Press (IP) was a weekly news magazine produced on behalf of the Fourth International (FI) between 1963 and 1986. The magazine was founded in Paris as World Outlook in 1963 under the editorial direction of Joseph Hansen, Pierre Frank and Reba Hansen as a "labor press service". A parallel edition in French was named Perspective mondiale.

World Outlook and Intercontinental Press produced a table of contents for the whole year in each year's last issue. Starting with volume 5 of 1967, World Outlook numbered the pages per year from the first to the last issue, with the year index referencing only the thru page number instead of issue and page within the issue.

The publication was interrupted after the October 29, 1965 issue (Vol. 3 No 31) because of an illness of editor Joseph Hansen, after which weekly publication resumed in New York with the February 4, 1966 issue (Vol 4 No 1).

In order to avoid costly litigation over the name with another magazine with the same title, the magazine was renamed Intercontinental Press with Vol 6 No 17 of May 6, 1968. This led to the common abbreviation as IP. The editors took the occasion to look back on the magazines evolution technical editorial changes since the first issues published in 1963 which were printed from type-writer produced stencils on a Rex Rotary mimeograph to offset printing, and reflected on the circulation and changing role of their publication:

Between 1973 and 1978, a factional disagreement between the majority of the FI and the leadership of the Socialist Workers Party (US) started to affect IP: the Hansens were leaders of the SWP, which housed and managed the magazine, and IP tended towards the SWP's viewpoint more than the FI's. In 1973 the FI initiated an English-language edition of Inprecor, which merged with IP after the dissolution of the international factions in 1978. The merged magazine got the subtitle combined with Inprecor (which was dropped in 1985).

After the summer break in 1982, IP changed to a bi-weekly schedule, which was originally meant to be provisional, but which persisted to the end.

In 1983, new disagreements between the SWP and USFI developed. Again, IP favoured the SWP's viewpoint more than the United Secretariat's. This prompted the FI to reestablish the English-language edition of Inprecor, which is called 'International Viewpoint'. After the 1985 World Congress the SWP withdrew more and more from the Fourth International.

Intercontinental Press ceased publication in the summer 1986 with Volume 24, Number 16 of August 11, 1986, "merging resources with 'The Militant' and 'New International'". The subscriptions to the fortnightly IP were transferred to weekly The Militant for the number of weeks remaining, not the number of issues.

References

Further reading
 </ref>

External links
Catalogue of the IP collection, held at the Modern Records Centre, University of Warwick
 Digitized archive with search facility

Fourth International (post-reunification)
Marxist magazines